This is a list of properties and districts in Marion County, Georgia that are listed on the National Register of Historic Places (NRHP).

Current listings

|}

References

Marion
Buildings and structures in Marion County, Georgia